Qualifier 2 of the Qualifying Round of the 2017 World Baseball Classic was held at Estadio B'Air, Mexicali, Mexico from March 17 to 20, 2016.

Qualifier 2 was a modified double-elimination tournament. The winners for the first games matched up in the second game, while the losers faced each other in an elimination game. The winners of the elimination game then played the losers of the non-elimination game in another elimination game. The remaining two teams then played each other to determine the winners of the Qualifier 2.

Bracket

Results
All times are Pacific Daylight Time (UTC−07:00).

Nicaragua 5, Germany 4

Mexico 2, Czech Republic 1

Czech Republic 15, Germany 3

Mexico 11, Nicaragua 0

Nicaragua 7, Czech Republic 6

Mexico 12, Nicaragua 1

External links
Official website

Qualifier 2
Baseball in Mexico
History of Baja California
International baseball competitions hosted by Mexico
World Baseball Classic – Qualifier 2
Sport in Mexicali
Sports competitions in Baja California